Denis Prieur may refer to:

 Denis Prieur (mayor) (1791–1857), 10th mayor of New Orleans, Louisiana
 Denis Prieur (painter) (born 1957), French painter